The 2017 Netball Quad Series was the third Netball Quad Series of test matches, contested by four of the five highest ranked nations in netball. Australia were the defending series champion, having won the series held earlier in the year.

New Zealand were the winners of the series.

Teams

Matches

Round 1

Round 2

Round 3

Standings
<noinclude>

See also

 Netball Quad Series

References

External links
  Fixtures and results for the series – Netball Australia website
 

2017
2017 in netball
2017 in Australian netball
2017 in New Zealand netball
2017 in English netball
2017 in South African women's sport
International netball competitions hosted by Australia
International netball competitions hosted by New Zealand
August 2017 sports events in Australia
September 2017 sports events in New Zealand